Robert Steckley (born 16 February 1980) is a Canadian former professional tennis player.

Steckley, who had a best singles ranking of 464, made his only ATP Tour main draw appearance as a wildcard at the 2005 Rogers Cup, a Masters tournament in Montreal, where he lost his first round match in three sets to Kenneth Carlsen. He won an ITF Futures title at Rockhampton in 2006.

A member of the Canada Davis Cup team in 2005 and 2006, Steckley played in three singles rubbers. On debut in 2005 he defeated Daniel Vallverdú of Venezuela, but lost both his matches in 2006, one of which was through a retirement.

Steckely has coached several players on tour, including Lucie Šafářová and Denis Shapovalov.

ITF Futures titles

Singles: (1)

Doubles: (1)

See also
List of Canada Davis Cup team representatives

References

External links
 
 
 

1980 births
Living people
Canadian male tennis players
Canadian tennis coaches
Racket sportspeople from Ontario
20th-century Canadian people
21st-century Canadian people